Martin Kušej (born 14 May 1962) is an Austrian theatre and opera director, and is director of the Burgtheater Vienna. According to German news magazine Focus, Kušej belongs to the ten most important theatre directors who have emerged in the German-speaking world since the millennium. He is considered one of the most important directors working today, acclaimed for his dark and incisive productions.

Born into the Slovene-speaking minority in the Austrian state of Carinthia he studied German, Literature and Sport Sciences at the University of Graz from 1979–82. He then moved to the local University of Music and Performing Arts and graduated from the MA course in theatre directing in 1984. His final showcase production was Ultramarine by David Brett; his Master thesis was on Robert Wilson.

In 1986, after his alternative civil service, he became an assistant director at the State Theatre in Salzburg from where he moved to the Slovenian National Theatre in Ljubljana in the same role.

Since 1990, he has been working freelance in Slovenia, Austria, Italy and Germany. Together with Austrian set designer Martin Zehetgruber and dramaturge Sylvia Brandl, he founded the independent group ’’my friend martin’’. They produced various plays for international festivals, including Franz Falsch F Falsch Dein Falsch Nichts Mehr Stille Tiefer Wald based on works by Franz Kafka.

In the 1993/1994 season he became a resident director at the Staatstheater in Stuttgart, Germany. He received the Gertrud Eysoldt Prize for young directors for his version of  Intrigue and Love by Friedrich Schiller which he had directed earlier that year at Stadttheater Klagenfurt in Austria, and which had produced a major scandal with audiences leaving the theatre within the first few minutes.

In 1996 he debuted as an opera director in Stuttgart with King Arthur by Henry Purcell and John Dryden. Since then he has directed operas in the opera houses of Stuttgart, Verona, Zurich, Berlin, Munich, Vienna, Amsterdam and at the Salzburg Festival. Towards the end of his time as resident director in Stuttgart he also worked at the Burgtheater in Vienna and at Thalia Theater in Hamburg.

In 1999, he was invited to the Berliner Theatertreffen festival with his Hamburg production of Tales from the Vienna Woods by Ödön von Horváth. Since the 2000/2001 season, he has been working as a freelance director, again at the Burgtheater and at Hamburg’s Thalia Theatre, amongst others.

From 2004–06, he was the artistic director of the drama section at the Salzburg Festival, then moved on to work as a freelance opera and theatre director again in the 2006/2007 season. From 2011 to 2019, he was the artistic director of the Residenz Theatre ("Bayerisches Staatsschauspiel").

Since September 2019, Kušej is director of the Burgtheater Vienna.

Selected stage productions

Theatre

 1988: Play – K-Werk, Graz
 1988: The Sinking of the Titanic – Schauspielhaus, Graz
 1990: Faith, Hope and Charity – Mladinsko Theatre, Ljubljana
 1991: Scandal after Cankar – Mladinsko Theatre, Ljubljana
 1992: The Dream as a Life – Schauspielhaus, Graz
 1993:  Intrigue and Love – Stadttheater, Klagenfurt and Staatstheater Stuttgart
 1993: Herzog Theodor von Gotland – Staatstheater, Stuttgart
 1994: The Prince of Homburg – Staatstheater, Stuttgart
 1995: Die Unbekannte aus der Seine – Staatstheater, Stuttgart
 1995: Clavigo – Staatstheater, Stuttgart
 1996: Richard III – Volksbühne am Rosa-Luxemburg-Platz, Berlin
 1997: Oedipus Rex – Staatstheater, Stuttgart
 1998: Tales from the Vienna Woods – Thalia Theater, Hamburg
 1999: Cleansed – Staatstheater, Stuttgart
 2000: Hamlet – Salzburg Festival and Staatstheater, Stuttgart
 2000: The Ghost Sonata – Thalia Theater, Hamburg and Stadttheater, Klagenfurt
 2001: Belief and Home – Burgtheater, Vienna
 2001: Edward II (play) – Thalia Theater, Hamburg
 2002: Faith, Hope and Charity – Burgtheater, Vienna
 2004: A Flea in Her Ear – Thalia Theater, Hamburg and Stadttheater, Klagenfurt
 2005: König Ottokars Glück und Ende – Burgtheater, Vienna
 2006: The Belle Vue – Thalia Theater, Hamburg and Stadttheater, Klagenfurt
 2007: Woyzeck – Residenz Theatre, Munich
 2009: The She-Devil – Burgtheater, Vienna
 2011: The Vast Domain – Residenz Theatre, Munich
 2012: Hedda Gabler – Residenz Theatre, Munich
 2012: The Anarchist – Residenz Theatre, Munich
 2012: The Bitter Tears of Petra von Kant – Residenz Theatre, Munich (German theatre prize Der Faust for Best Direction of a stage play) 
 2013: In Agony – Residenz Theatre, Munich and Vienna
 2014: Goethe's Faust – Residenz Theatre, Munich
 2015: Eugène Labiche's ICH ICH ICH – Residenz Theatre, Munich
 2016: The Crucible by Arthur Miller – Burgtheater, Vienna
 2017: Phädra’s Night, a project by Albert Ostermaier and Martin Kušej – Residenz Theatre, Munich
 2018: Noises Off by Michael Frayn – Residenz Theatre, Munich

Opera
 1998: Fidelio – Staatsoper Stuttgart
 1999: Salome – Graz Opera House
 2001: Le convenienze ed inconvenienze teatrali – Staatsoper Stuttgart
 2002: Don Giovanni – Salzburg Festival
 2004: Carmen – Staatsoper, Berlin
 2007: The Magic Flute – Zurich Opera
 2010: The Flying Dutchman – Het Muziektheater, Amsterdam
 2012: Macbeth – Bavarian Staatsoper, Munich
 2013: La forza del destino – Bavarian Staatsoper, Munich

References

Austrian theatre directors
Austrian opera directors
1961 births
Living people
University of Graz alumni

External links